The Memorial of Hubert Jerzy Wagner is a volleyball friendly competition for the national teams, currently held every year and organized by the Hubert Wagner Foundation. 

The first Memorial was held in 2003. The competition has been held every year since, except 2020 due to COVID-19 pandemic.

Tournament

History
The tournament is played in the middle of the year, always about two weeks before the most important event of the year. Competitions have been created in memory of the best volleyball coach in Poland, Hubert Jerzy Wagner, who won the 1974 FIVB Men's Volleyball World Championship, the Olympic gold in 1976 and silver medals in the Men's European Volleyball Championship in 1975 and 1983 for the Polish team.

In the first few years teams played in Olsztyn. It is now played in various Polish cities to promote volleyball. In 2008, the memorial was also the qualifying tournament for the 2009 Men's European Volleyball Championship. The first memorial was won by the Dutch national team, which was ahead of Poland and Spain. In the second edition Russia triumphed, and the next again The Netherlands. The winner of the fourth edition was Poland, the fifth - Germany. The next two editions were again won by the hosts. In 2010 the winners were Brazil, and in 2011 Italy. In 2012 the edition of the memorial was won by Poland ahead of Germany, Argentina and Iran. Poland retained the title in 2013.

Results summary

Medal table

Participating nations

MVP by edition

 2004 – 
 2005 – 
 2006 – 
 2007 – 
 2008 – 
 2009 – 
 2010 – 
 2011 – 
 2012 – 
 2013 – 
 2014 – 
 2015 – 
 2016 – 
 2017 – 
 2018 – 
 2019 – 
 2021 –  
 2022 –

National team appearances

External links
Official website

 
International volleyball competitions hosted by Poland